Modjeska is both a surname and a given name. Notable people with the name include:

Drusilla Modjeska (born 1946), Australian writer and editor
Helena Modjeska (1840–1909), Polish-American actress
Modjeska Monteith Simkins (1899–1992), African-American activist